QWERTY, along with its direct derivatives such as QWERTZ and AZERTY, is the primary keyboard layout for the Latin alphabet. However, there are also keyboard layouts that do not resemble QWERTY very closely, if at all. Some of these are used for languages where QWERTY may be unsuitable. Others are specially designed to reduce finger movement and are claimed by some proponents to offer higher typing speed along with ergonomic benefits.

Comparison
This is a chart of alternative keyboard layouts for typing Latin-script characters. National and specialized versions of QWERTY which do not change the letter keys are not included.

See also
 IBM PC keyboard
 Apple Keyboard

References

Latin-script keyboard layouts